Euclides da Cunha Paulista is a municipality in the state of São Paulo in Brazil. It is named after Euclides da Cunha, a Brazilian writer. The population is 9,325 (2020 est.) in an area of 574 km². The elevation is 265 m.

The municipality contains 30% of the  Mico Leão Preto Ecological Station, established in 2002.
It also contains part of the  Great Pontal Reserve, created in 1942.

References

Municipalities in São Paulo (state)